Charles Dominic Foletta (2 October 1875 – 30 January 1966) was an Australian rules footballer who played for Fitzroy in the Victorian Football League (VFL).

A rover, Foletta played at both Fitzroy and Collingwood while they were competing the Victorian Football Association (VFA) before crossing to Brunswick. Foletta then rejoined Fitzroy for the 1899 VFL season and made five appearances mid year but missed out on their finals campaign where they claimed a second premiership.

In the West Australian Football Association, Foletta captain-coached East Fremantle to back to back Grand Final wins in 1902 and 1903. He then performed the same role at Launceston City, resulting in the 1907 and 1908 Northern Tasmanian Football Association premierships.

Having achieved success as a player, the former Fitzroy player returned to the VFL as a goal umpire and officiated in 31 games from 1913 to 1915.

References

Holmesby, Russell and Main, Jim (2007). The Encyclopedia of AFL Footballers. 7th ed. Melbourne: Bas Publishing.

1875 births
1966 deaths
Australian rules footballers from Victoria (Australia)
Collingwood Football Club (VFA) players
Fitzroy Football Club (VFA) players
Fitzroy Football Club players
Brunswick Football Club players
East Fremantle Football Club players
East Fremantle Football Club coaches
City-South Football Club players
City-South Football Club coaches
Australian Football League umpires
People from Daylesford, Victoria